Edmonton-West Henday is a provincial electoral district in Alberta, Canada. The district is one of 87 districts mandated to return a single member (MLA) to the Legislative Assembly of Alberta using the first past the post method of voting. It was contested for the first time in the 2019 Alberta election.

Geography
The district is located in western Edmonton, consisting of two residential areas separated by a large, mostly un-populated industrial area. In the northeast corner of the riding are the neighbourhoods of Wellington, Athlone and Calder, and in the south of the riding are the neighbourhoods of Terra Losa, La Perle, Belmead, Stewart Greens, Webber Greens, Suder Greens, Potter Greens, Breckenridge Greens, Rosenthal and Secord.

History

The district was created in 2017 when the Electoral Boundaries Commission recommended renaming Edmonton-Meadowlark, alongside a change in boundaries that saw the Meadowlark Park neighbourhood (among others) moved out of the riding. The Commission decided to name the district after Anthony Henday Drive which bisects the riding, rather than simply "Edmonton-West" to avoid confusion with the federal district of that name.

Electoral results

References

Alberta provincial electoral districts
Politics of Edmonton